Millinery Center Synagogue is a Jewish Orthodox synagogue located in the Garment District of New York City.

History 
The synagogue was supported by the many millinery organizations that were based in the neighborhood. A group of these ready-to-wear industry business men had been meeting in various spaces, mostly in a loft on West 36th Street. Their rabbi during this very loosely organized time was Rabbi Moshe Ralbag. In January 1933, the congregation was more formally organized and the name of the synagogue, the Millinery Center Synagogue, was agreed upon, although the meeting place was temporary, at 1011 Sixth Avenue, on the second floor. Moe Brillstein (the father of film producer Bernie Brillstein) became president and started a building fund. At that point the congregation came together and decided to build a synagogue.

Due to the density of millinery businesses in the neighborhood, at its peak, services for daily minyan were typically so heavily attended that the prayer sessions were held in rotating shifts.

Structure 

The synagogue was built by H.I. Feldman, a prolific, Yale-educated architect who built thousands of Art Deco and Modernist-style buildings in New York City, notably 1025 Fifth Avenue (between 83rd and 84th Streets) on the Upper East Side and the LaGuardia Houses on the Lower East Side, as well as many buildings that line the Grand Concourse in the Bronx. Feldman and his company, The Feldman Company, also built the Federation of Jewish Philanthropies building (130 East 59th Street) and the United Jewish Appeal building (220 West 58th Street).

There were wartime restrictions on building, so building was postponed for a time until 1947. The building's construction was completed in September 1948, and the synagogue was dedicated on September 12, 1948.

The limestone building itself is narrow, approximately 19 feet wide by 60 feet deep, and cost $150,000 to build. It was notable for having air conditioning.

Current 
On May 3, 2017, the Board of Trustees of Millinery Center Synagogue nominated Rabbi Avrohom Dov Kahn to serve as rabbi. On May 10, 2017 Rabbi Kahn was elected in a landslide. It was the first election of a rabbi of the synagogue in over two decades.

A week later on May 17, Rabbi Kahn was formally installed as rabbi in a program featuring three young professionals who spoke about the important impact the synagogue and Rabbi Kahn had made on them. Harav Doniel Lander, Rosh Hayeshiva of Yeshivas Ohr Hachaim, spoke movingly of his decades-long close friendship with Rabbi Kahn and those attributes that made Rabbi Kahn eminently qualified to lead the synagogue in its rejuvenation and renewal efforts. Rabbi Kahn concluded the program by outlining what he hoped to do for the synagogue and how he hoped to guide MCS to reach out and benefit Jews throughout all of midtown Manhattan.”

Leadership

Rabbinical 
 Rabbi Moshe Ralbag
 Rabbi Morris Gordon
 1942-1970: Dr. Alexander J. Burnstein
 1980-85: Rabbi Abraham Berger
 1985-1990: Rabbi David Friedberg
 1990-1992: Rabbi Leonard Guttman
 1992-2016: Rabbi Hayim S. Wahrman
 2017-present: Rabbi Avrohom Dov Kahn

Cantor 
 1935-1944: Rev. Israel Wolwoff
 1945-1952: Cantor Seymour Tardov
 1952-1953: Cantor Abraham L. Eckstein
 1954- : Cantor Joseph Guttman

Presidents 
 Moe Brenner, Willow Hat Co.
 Harry Sperling, Lanrose Hat Co.
 1943-1950: Moe Brillstein
 1950-1951: David Blum
 1952-1953: Ernest "Ernie" Moskowitz
 1953/4-1955/6: Abraham "Abe" Friedenberg
 1955/6-1957/8: Meyer G. Kantor
 1957/8-1959: Moe Brillstein
 1959-: Israel E. Stillman
 Abraham "Abe" Kramer
 Joseph Lobel
 Jack Markowitz
 Michael Reminick

Founders 
 Moe Brillstein
 Sam Neger

Publications 
 Millinery Center Synagogue. Millinery Center Synagogue. Twentieth Annual Banquet, Hotel Astor, Saturday, February 19, 1955. New York, NY: Millinery Center Synagogue, 1955. Microfilm.  
 Millinery Center Synagogue. Millinery Center Synagogue. Twenty-Fifth Annual Banquet, Hotel Roosevelt, Saturday, February 13, 1960. New York, NY: Millinery Center Synagogue, 1960. Microfilm.  
 Millinery Center Synagogue. Millinery Center Synagogue. Twenty-Ninth Annual Banquet, Hotel Americana, Saturday, February 22, 1964. New York, NY: Millinery Center Synagogue, 1964. Book.  
 Millinery Center Synagogue. Millinery Center Synagogue. Thirty-Fourth Annual Banquet, Hotel Plaza, Sunday, February 16, 1969. New York, NY: Millinery Center Synagogue, 1969. Book.  
 Millinery Center Synagogue. Millinery Center Synagogue. Fortieth Annual Journal, Regency Hotel, Saturday, February 15, 1975. New York, NY: Millinery Center Synagogue, 1975. Book.

References

External links 

 Millinery Center Synagogue on Facebook
 Millinery Center Synagogue Official Website

Synagogues in Manhattan
Orthodox synagogues in New York City
Garment districts
Modernist architecture
Art Deco architecture in Manhattan
Art Deco synagogues